The Iran Men's National Volleyball Team is the official national men's volleyball team of Iran. It is governed by the Islamic Republic of Iran Volleyball Federation (I.R.I.V.F.) and takes part in international volleyball competitions.

As of 11 September 2022, Team Melli is considered as the second team in Asia, as it ranks 10th in the FIVB World Rankings.

The national team won the Asian Volleyball Championship four times: in 2011 Tehran, 2013 Dubai, 2019 Tehran and 2021 Chiba & Funabashi

In its first appearance in the competition since joining the 2013 World League, Iran has been a dominant force in Group 1 of the competition, posing a challenge to any opponent. Defeating Italy and Cuba in these games, Iran introduced itself as a formidable contender.

In 2014 World League campaign, Iran's national team reached fourth place in Group 1 after a straight-set defeat to their Italian hosts in the bronze medal match. In these games, Iran had already defeated Brazil, Italy and Poland.

Iran has also competed in the World Championship four times, with their best result obtained in 2014 Poland where they ended up in 6th place. In those games Iran qualified from the first and second rounds with, respectively, four and five wins; their only defeat was against France.

Iran defeated Japan to win the gold medal at the Asian Games Korea in 2014. Consecutively, in the 2018 Asian Games in Indonesia, Iran cruised past Japan and South Korea to win the gold medal.

Iran made it to the Olympic Games for the first time in their history in 2016 as the top-ranked Asian squad at the World Olympic Qualification Tournament in Japan. Iran finished in 5th place in the competition.

History
The history of Iran's national volleyball team dates back to around 1920 when Mir Mehdi Varzandeh brought volleyball regulations to Iran. During World War II, Allied forces occupied Iran, and Iranians participated in sports, including volleyball, with soldiers. At that time a friendly match was arranged between the Iranian and Russian Army teams. In 1958, for the first time, national men's team of Pakistan was invited to Tehran for some friendly matches with the national team, club teams and the Army team. Iran's national team first attended an international competition at the 1958 Asian Games, where they won the silver medal.

Tournament records

Notes: Gold, silver, bronze backgrounds indicate 1st, 2nd and 3rd finishes, respectively. Bold text indicates best finish in tournament.

Olympic Games

World Championship

World Cup

World Grand Champions Cup

World League

Nations League

Asian Championship

Asian Games

Asian Cup

Other tournaments

Islamic Solidarity Games

West Asian Games

Central Asian Zone Championship

Results and fixtures

Previous matches

Team

Current squad

Representing Iran at the 2022 FIVB Volleyball Men's World Championship.

 Head coach:  Behrouz Ataei

Head coaches
Note: The following list may not be complete.

A Team

Coaching staff

B Team

Stadium

The team's home arena are Azadi Indoor Stadium, Azadi Volleyball Hall, Rezazadeh Stadium and Ghadir Stadium.

Kit providers
The table below shows the history of kit providers for the Iran national volleyball team.

Sponsorship
Primary sponsors include: main sponsors like MCI and Tourism Bank, Refah Stores other sponsors: Roamer.

References

  Asian Volleyball Championship
  Volleyball at the Asian Games
  Iran Volleyball History

External links

Official website
FIVB profile

Notable squads

 

 
National men's volleyball teams
Men's sport in Iran
Volleyball in Iran